Results from the 2008 Buenos Aires Grand Prix held at Buenos Aires on August 10, 2008, in the Autódromo Oscar Alfredo Gálvez.The race was the second race for the 2008 Buenos Aires Grand Prix of Formula Three Sudamericana.

Classification 

Buenos Aires Grand Prix
Buenos Aires Grand Prix Race 1
2008 in Argentine motorsport
August 2008 sports events in South America